Cyphocottus is a genus of ray-finned fish belonging to the family Cottidae, the typical sculpins. These fishes are endemic to endemic to Lake Baikal in Russia.

Species
There are currently two recognized species in this genus:
 Cyphocottus eurystomus (Taliev, 1955)
 Cyphocottus megalops (Gratzianov, 1902)

References

 
Abyssocottinae
Scorpaeniformes genera
Fish of Lake Baikal